In chess, the Cambridge Springs Defense (or less commonly, the Pillsbury Variation) is a variation of the Queen's Gambit Declined that begins with the moves:

1. d4 d5
2. c4 e6
3. Nc3 Nf6
4. Bg5 Nbd7
5. Nf3 c6
6. e3 Qa5

Black breaks the pin on the h4–d8 diagonal and forms a pin of his own on the c3-knight (exploiting the absence of the White's queen bishop from the ). If Black later plays dxc4, there may be threats against the g5-bishop. Note that 5.cxd5 cannot win a pawn because of the Elephant Trap. The main line continues 7.Nd2 Bb4 with the threat of ...Ne4 and pressure along the a5–e1 diagonal.

The Encyclopaedia of Chess Openings code is D52.

Background
The first recorded use of the Cambridge Springs was by Emanuel Lasker in 1892. The name derives from a 1904 tournament in Cambridge Springs, Pennsylvania, in which the defense was used several times. Practitioners of the opening have included Efim Bogoljubov, Vasily Smyslov, Garry Kasparov, and Magnus Carlsen.

The line remains popular among amateurs because there are several traps White must avoid. For example, 7.Nd2 Bb4 8.Qc2 0-0 9.Bd3?? dxc4! (threatening ...Qxg5) 10.Bxf6 cxd3! (a zwischenzug) 11.Qxd3 Nxf6 and Black has won a piece.

Continuations
White has several choices on his seventh move. The most common are:
7.Nd2 (the main line) immediately breaks the pin on the c3 knight and defends e4; 7...Bb4 is answered by 8.Qc2, defending the c3 knight and covering e4.
7.cxd5 avoids complications by clarifying the situation in the center. Black's strongest is the recapture 7...Nxd5, continuing the attack on c3.
7.Bxf6 avoids tactics involving discovered attacks on the g5-bishop.

Example games 
 Capablanca vs. Alekhine, World Championship Match, Buenos Aires 1927:1.d4 d5 2.c4 e6 3.Nc3 Nf6 4.Bg5 Nbd7 5.e3 c6 6.Nf3 Qa5 7.Nd2 Bb4 8.Qc2 dxc4 9.Bxf6 Nxf6 10.Nxc4 Qc7 11.a3 Be7 12.Be2 0-0 13.0-0 Bd7 14.b4 b6 15.Bf3 Rac8 16.Rfd1 Rfd8 17.Rac1 Be8 18.g3 Nd5 19.Nb2 Qb8 20.Nd3 Bg5 21.Rb1 Qb7 22.e4 Nxc3 23.Qxc3 Qe7 24.h4 Bh6 25.Ne5 g6 26.Ng4 Bg7 27.e5 h5 28.Ne3 c5 29.bxc5 bxc5 30.d5 exd5 31.Nxd5 Qe6 32.Nf6+ Bxf6 33.exf6 Rxd1+ 34.Rxd1 Bc6 35.Re1 Qf5 36.Re3 c4 37.a4 a5 38.Bg2 Bxg2 39.Kxg2 Qd5+ 40.Kh2 Qf5 41.Rf3 Qc5 42.Rf4 Kh7 43.Rd4 Qc6 44.Qxa5 c3 45.Qa7 Kg8 46.Qe7 Qb6 47.Qd7 Qc5 48.Re4 Qxf2+ 49.Kh3 Qf1+ 50.Kh2 Qf2+ 51.Kh3 Rf8 52.Qc6 Qf1+ 53.Kh2 Qf2+ 54.Kh3 Qf1+ 55.Kh2 Kh7 56.Qc4 Qf2+ 57.Kh3 Qg1 58.Re2 Qf1+ 59.Kh2 Qxf6 60.a5 Rd8 61.a6 Qf1 62.Qe4 Rd2 63.Rxd2 cxd2 64.a7 d1=Q 65.a8=Q Qg1+ 66.Kh3 Qdf1+ 0–1 (67.Qg2 Qh1#)
 Gelfand vs. Carlsen, World Chess Championship Candidates Tournament, London 2013: 1.d4 Nf6 2.c4 e6 3.Nf3 d5 4.Nc3 Nbd7 5.Bg5 c6 6.e3 Qa5 7.cxd5 Nxd5 8.Rc1 Nxc3 9.bxc3 Ba3 10.Rc2 b6 11.Bd3 Ba6 12.0-0 Bxd3 13.Qxd3 0-0 14.e4 Rfe8 15.e5 h6 16.Bh4 c5 17.Nd2 cxd4 18.cxd4 Rac8 19.Nc4 Qb5 20.f4 Rc7 21.Qxa3 Rxc4 22.Rxc4 Qxc4 23.Bf2 Qc7 24.Rc1 Qb7 25.Qd6 Nf8 26.g3 Rc8 27.Rxc8 Qxc8 28.d5 exd5 29.Qxd5 g6 30.Kg2 Ne6 31.Qf3 Kg7 32.a3 h5 33.h4 Qc2 34.Qb7 Qa4 35.Qf3 b5 36.f5 gxf5 37.Qxf5 Qxa3 38.Qxh5 a5 39.Qg4+ Kf8 40.h5 Qc1 41.Qe4 b4 42.Be3 Qc7 43.Qa8+ Kg7 44.h6+ Kh7 45.Qe4+ Kg8 46.Qa8+ Qd8 47.Qxd8+ Nxd8 48.Kf3 a4 49.Ke4 Nc6 50.Bc1 Na5 51.Bd2 b3 52.Kd3 Nc4 53.Bc3 a3 54.g4 Kh7 55.g5 Kg6 56.Bd4 b2 57.Kc2 Nd2 0–1

See also
 List of chess openings
 List of chess openings named after places

References

Bibliography

Further reading

External links
Cambridge Springs Defense
4 Annotated World Championship Games in the Cambridge Springs

Chess openings
1892 in chess
1904 in chess